The 15647/48 Lokmanya Tilak Terminus–Guwahati Express is an Express  train belonging to Indian Railways Northeast Frontier Railway zone that runs between  and  in India.

It operates as train number 15647 from Lokmanya Tilak Terminus to Guwahati and as train number 15648 in the reverse direction, serving the states of Maharashtra, Madhya Pradesh, Uttar Pradesh, Bihar, Jharkhand, West Bengal & Assam.

Coaches
The 15647 / 48 Lokmanya Tilak Terminus–Guwahati Express has one AC 2-tier,  four AC 3-tier, 12 sleeper class, three general unreserved & two SLR (seating with luggage rake) coaches . It carries a pantry car.

As is customary with most train services in India, coach composition may be amended at the discretion of Indian Railways depending on demand.

Service

Routing

Traction

References

External links
15647 Mumbai LTT-Guwahati Express (via Malda Town) at India Rail Info
15648 Guwahati-Mumbai LTT Express (via Malda Town) at India Rail Info

Express trains in India
Transport in Mumbai
Rail transport in Maharashtra
Rail transport in Madhya Pradesh
Rail transport in Uttar Pradesh
Rail transport in Bihar
Rail transport in Jharkhand
Rail transport in West Bengal
Rail transport in Assam
Transport in Guwahati